The 2021 Men's EuroHockey Championship IV was supposed to be the ninth edition of the EuroHockey Championship IV, the fourth level of the men's European field hockey championships organized by the European Hockey Federation. It was scheduled to be held from 1 to 7 August 2021 in Kordin, Paola, Malta. After four teams withdrew from the tournament due to the travel restrictions related to the COVID-19 pandemic the tournament was officially cancelled on 31 May 2021.

Qualified teams
Participating nations have qualified based on their final ranking from the 2019 competition.

See also
2021 Men's EuroHockey Championship III

Notes

References

EuroHockey Championship IV
Men 4
EuroHockey Championship IV